Brigadier John Henry Ridge CBE is a senior British Army officer.

Military career
Ridge was commissioned into the Royal Engineers in 1995. He served as commanding officer of 26 Engineer Regiment in which role he was deployed to Afghanistan. He went on to become commander of 8 Engineer Brigade in October 2015 and in that role led the British response to Hurricane Irma, an extremely powerful Cape Verde hurricane that caused widespread destruction across its path, in September 2017. He went on to become Chief, Joint Force Operations at Permanent Joint Headquarters in Northwood in September 2017 and will become General Office Commanding of Army Recruiting and Initial Training Command in April 2020.

He was appointed a Commander of the Order of the British Empire in the 2018 New Year Honours.

References

Living people
Royal Engineers officers
Commanders of the Order of the British Empire
Year of birth missing (living people)
British Army brigadiers